Bonneville is an unincorporated community in Multnomah County, Oregon, United States, on Interstate 84 and the Columbia River. Bonneville is best known as the site of Bonneville Dam. North Bonneville, Washington is across the river.

For decades before the dam was built, Bonneville was popular as a picnic spot for people living along the Columbia River between Portland and The Dalles, and the railroad company maintained an "eating house" for travelers there. Bonneville railroad station was named for explorer Benjamin Bonneville. The name "Bonneville" did not appear on maps until the late 1880s. Bonneville post office was established in 1900.

Climate
Bonneville has a warm-summer Mediterranean climate (Köppen Csb).

References

Columbia River Gorge
Historic Columbia River Highway
Portland metropolitan area
Unincorporated communities in Multnomah County, Oregon
1900 establishments in Oregon
Populated places established in 1900
Unincorporated communities in Oregon